The Snipex T-Rex is a single-shot anti-materiel rifle chambered for the 14.5×114mm cartridge and manufactured by XADO-Holding Ltd., Kharkiv, Ukraine.

Design
The T-Rex is a bullpup bolt-action rifle. During loading, the cartridge is inserted into the breech opening with the bolt open. Barrel locking is achieved through a rotating bolt. The floating barrel is in free recoil when the bullet flies out. Recoil is suppressed due to the muzzle brake, the effect of a recoil isolator, an elastic multilayer shoulder pad, and a balanced weight.

The rifle is suitable for shooting resting both on the right and left shoulders. It has a height-adjustable cheek rest that can be installed on the right or on the left side. The rifle has a bipod and an adjustable rear support, which allows for adjustment to the shooter's needs.

The rifle has a Picatinny rail with 50 MOA gradient, on which various sighting devices can be mounted.

History
The first development was presented at the XIV International Specialized Exhibition “Arms and Security 2017”. In the course of constant improvements, a number of changes were made to the design of the rifle. Based on the state examinations results, the 14.5×114 mm caliber Snipex T- Rex rifle has been adopted by the Armed Forces of Ukraine in 2020.

Users
: Used by the Armed Forces of Ukraine

See also
Snipex M
Snipex Rhino Hunter
Snipex Alligator
Istiglal anti-materiel rifle

References

External links
 Official website

14.5×114mm anti-materiel rifles
Single-shot bolt-action rifles
Rifles of Ukraine